Reha Denemeç (born 1961 in Turkey) is a senior advisor to the President of the Republic of Turkey, co-founder of the ruling Justice and Development Party (AK Party),  and an honorary associate of the Parliamentary Assembly of the Council of Europe.

Education and military service 
Denemeç graduated from the Middle East Technical University in Ankara with a B.S. in economics. Later, he received his M.A. in economics from the University of Delaware. He also completed programs titled "Managing and Shaping Change in the Information Age" and "Innovation for Economic Development"  at Harvard University's John F. Kennedy School of Government.

Denemeç served as a commando second lieutenant in the Turkish Armed Forces.

Career 
Denemeç began his career in the public sector in the late 1980s as the executive assistant to the undersecretary of Turkey's State Planning Organization (now Ministry of Development). He was later appointed as the executive assistant and advisor to the Minister of State, in charge of the treasury, foreign trade, planning, privatization and public banks in 1987. After receiving his M.A. degree, he returned to State Planning Organization and worked as an expert at the Directorate of Economic Models and Strategic Research.

In 1993, he began advising the founder and chairman of Yeni Parti (New Party). The party was established to carry out the "second transformation program" of former President Turgut Özal, who had aimed to establish an executive presidency with constitutional powers.

In 1997, Denemeç was appointed deputy secretary-general of the State Planning Organization. Shortly thereafter, he became the acting secretary-general of the organization. He served on the technical board of Turkish Standards Institution.

In the formative period of Justice and Development Party, leading up to its first national election landslide victory in 2002, Denemeç was co-founder of the party and advisor to the party chairman, Recep Tayyip Erdoğan, who would later become the President of the Republic of Turkey. He served on the party's board from 2001–2015, and as its vice chairman in charge of research and development for ten years. He was elected from Ankara as a member of the parliament for three consecutive terms, from 2002–2015, and was a member of Democracy Committee in the Turkish Parliament.

He was also a member of the International Board of Parliamentarians for Global Action, a non-profit, non-partisan international network of elected legislators.

Private sector 
He served on the board of Başak Insurance, and was the chairman of Ataköy Otelcilik, the entity that owns the Holiday Inn and Crowne Plaza hotels in Istanbul. He also worked as a senior executive of an energy group of conglomerate with wide-ranging interests throughout Central Asia.

Council of Europe 
From 2013 to 2015, he was the Chairman of the Turkish Delegation and Vice President of the Parliamentary Assembly of the Council of Europe (PACE) in Strasbourg. He is an honorary associate of PACE. He was also awarded the pro merito medal in appreciation of his services for PACE.

Family 
Denemeç is married with two children.

References

External links
 Justice and Development Party  
 TABC

Justice and Development Party (Turkey) politicians
Living people
University of Delaware alumni
1961 births
Members of the 24th Parliament of Turkey
Members of the 23rd Parliament of Turkey
Members of the 22nd Parliament of Turkey
Place of birth missing (living people)